Paul Karl Maria Harteck (20 July 190222 January 1985) was an Austrian physical chemist. In 1945 under Operation Epsilon in "the big sweep" throughout Germany, Harteck was arrested by the allied British and American Armed Forces for suspicion of aiding the Nazis in their nuclear weapons program and he was incarcerated at Farm Hall, an English house fitted with covert electronic listening devices, for six months.

Education 

Harteck studied chemistry at the University of Vienna and the Humboldt University of Berlin from 1921 to 1924.  He received his doctorate at the latter under Max Bodenstein in 1926.  From 1926 to 1928 he was Arnold Eucken’s teaching assistant at the University of Breslau.

Career 

From 1928 to 1933, Harteck was a staff scientist at the KWI für physikalische Chemie und Elektrochemie (KWIPC) (Kaiser Wilhelm Institute for Physical Chemistry and Elektrochemistry)  located in Dahlem-Berlin, where he worked with Karl Friedrich Bonhoeffer on experiments on parahydrogen and orthohydrogen.  While at the KWIPC, he completed his habilitation in 1931 at the Humboldt University of Berlin where he also supervised the dissertation of Karl-Hermann Geib who later developed the Girdler sulfide process.

In 1933, Harteck went to do research with Ernest Rutherford at the University of Cambridge. During this time, Rutherford was working on accelerator-driven nuclear fusion, and Harteck was credited in the 1934 paper on the topic.

Upon his return from England in 1934, he became an ordinarius professor and director of the physical chemistry department at the University of Hamburg.  From 1937, he was an advisor to the Heereswaffenamt (HWA, Army Ordnance Office).  In April 1939, along with his teaching assistant Wilhelm Groth, Harteck made contact with the Reichskriegsministerium (RKM, Reich Ministry of War) to alert them to the potential of military applications of nuclear chain reactions.  From that year, his department as a whole did research for the HWA, with emphasis on uranium isotope separation.  From 1940, with Hans Suess, his focus was on the use of heavy water as a neutron moderator.  In 1941, his department constructed a conversion unit for, then I.G. Farben controlled, Norsk Hydro in German-occupied Norway for the catalytic production of heavy water. The Norwegians were forced to install the plant at their own cost, as their contribution to German war effort.   In 1942, with the help of Werner Heisenberg, Harteck circumvented an appointment in Russia.  In February 1943, Harteck and his colleague Johannes Jensen suggested a new type of centrifugal isotope separation, which was adopted by the Anschütz Company.  Under his supervision Wilhelm Groth conducted the last enrichment experiments with the ultracentrifuge in Celle, a small town 120 km south of Hamburg. In late spring 1945, Harteck was arrested by the allied British and American Armed Forces and incarcerated at Farm Hall for six months under Operation Epsilon. In 1946, upon his return from incarceration, he became director of the chemistry department at the University, a position he held until 1950.

In 1951, Harteck became a resident professor at the Rensselaer Polytechnic Institute in Troy, New York, where he taught until 1968.
In 1937 and 1952, he was nominated for the Nobel Prize in Chemistry.

Internal reports 

The following reports were published in Kernphysikalische Forschungsberichte (Research Reports in Nuclear Physics), an internal publication of the German Uranverein.  The reports were classified Top Secret, they had very limited distribution, and the authors were not allowed to keep copies.  The reports were confiscated under the Allied Operation Alsos and sent to the United States Atomic Energy Commission for evaluation.  In 1971, the reports were declassified and returned to Germany. The reports are available at the Karlsruhe Nuclear Research Center and the American Institute of Physics.

 Paul Harteck, Johannes Jensen, Friedrich Knauer, and Hans Suess Über die Bremsung, die Diffusion und den Einfang von Neutronen in fester Kohlensäure und über ihren Einfang in Uran G-36 (19 August 1940)
 Paul Harteck Die Produktion von schwerem Wasser G-86 (December 1941)
 Paul Harteck Die Trennung der Uranisotope G-88 (December 1941)
 Paul Harteck and Johannes Jensen Der Thermodiffusionseffekt im Zusammenspiel mit der Konvektion durch mechanisch bewegte Wände und Vergleich mit der Thermosiphonwirkung G-89 (18 February 1941)
 Paul Harteck Die Gewinnung von schwerem Wasser G-154 (26 February 1942)
 Paul Harteck and Johannes Jensen Berechnung des Trenneffektes und der Ausbeute verschiedener Zentrifugenanordnungen zur Erhöhung des Wirkungsgrades einer einzelnen Zentrifuge G-158 (February 1943)
 Paul Harteck, Johannes Jensen, and Albert Suhr Über den Zusammenhang zwischen Ausbeute und Trennschärfe bei der Niederdruckkolonne G-159
 Paul Harteck Paul Harteck’s Institute Papers, Volume 1-6 G-341

Selected publications

Articles 

 A. Farkas, L. Farkas, P. Harteck Experiments on Heavy Hydrogen. II. The Ortho-Para Conversion, Proceedings of the Royal Society of London. Series A. Vol. 144, No. 852,  pp. 481–493 (29 March 1934)
 M. L. E. Oliphant, P. Harteck, Lord Rutherford Transmutation Effects Observed with Heavy Hydrogen, Proceedings of the Royal Society of London. Series A. Vol. 144, No. 853, pp. 692–703 (1 May 1934)

Books 

 K. F. Bonhoeffer and P. Harteck, Grundlagen Der PhotoChemie (Verlag Von Theodor Steinkopff, 1933)
 Konrad Beyerle, Wilhelm Groth, Paul Harteck, and Johannes Jensen Über Gaszentrifugen: Anreicherung der Xenon-, Krypton- und der Selen-Isotope nach dem Zentrifugenverfahren (Chemie, 1950); cited in Walker, 1993, 278.

Notes

References 

 Bernstein, Jeremy Hitler’s Uranium Club: The Secret Recording’s at Farm Hall (Copernicus, 2001) 
 Hentschel, Klaus, editor and Ann M. Hentschel, editorial assistant and Translator Physics and National Socialism: An Anthology of Primary Sources (Birkhäuser, 1996) 
 Schaaf, Michael Der Physikochemiker Paul Harteck (1902–1985) Dissertation (Stuttgart), 1999, published as: CENSIS-REPORT-33-99, Hamburg
 Schaaf, Michael: "Heisenberg and Weizsäcker haben sich überschätzt" ("Heisenberg and Weizsäcker overrated themselves"), Interview with Paul Harteck, in: Schaaf, Michael "Heisenberg, Hitler und die Bombe" (GNT-Verlag, 2018) 
 Schaaf, Michael  Schweres Wasser und Zentrifugen: Paul Harteck in Hamburg (1934–1951) 24 July 2003
 Walker, Mark German National Socialism and the Quest for Nuclear Power 1939–1949 (Cambridge, 1993)

External links 

 Annotated Bibliography for Paul Harteck from the Alsos Digital Library for Nuclear Issues
 MPIWG – Horst Kant Werner Heisenberg and the German Uranium Project (MPIWG, 2002)
 

1902 births
1985 deaths
German physical chemists
Nuclear program of Nazi Germany
Operation Epsilon
Rensselaer Polytechnic Institute faculty
20th-century German chemists
Academic staff of the University of Hamburg
Academic staff of the Humboldt University of Berlin